Henry Singleton may refer to:

Henry Singleton (judge) (1682–1759), Irish judge
Henry Singleton (painter) (1766–1839), English painter
Henry Earl Singleton (1916–1999), American industrialist